Smiley News is a British news publication, which focuses on positive news aligned with the UN's Sustainable Development Goals. It was founded in 2017, nearly four decades after Franklin Loufrani included feel-good stories in the French newspaper France-Soir. It also runs a series of nationwide events called Smiley Talks, which feature people telling personal stories.

It partnered with Royal Dutch Mint to create a medal to help fund a food box distribution project during the Christmas period in 2021.

Charity film awards
The Charity Film Awards began in 2015. Smiley partnered with the Charity Film Awards in 2020, to promote the award ceremony's focus on cause-based films. A year later, it was announced Smiley Movement arranged to manage and support the film awards. In 2022, Smiley Movement announced its 5th year of running the awards. The 2022 award ceremony is to be held a ODEON Luxe, Leicester Square, on March 22, 2022.

References

2017 establishments in the United Kingdom
British news websites
Internet properties established in 2017